The 1987 Virginia Slims of New Orleans was a women's tennis tournament played on indoor carpet courts in New Orleans, Louisiana in the United States that was part of the 1987 Virginia Slims World Championship Series. It was the fourth edition of the tournament and was held from September 28 through October 4, 1987. First-seeded Chris Evert won the singles title, her second at the event after 1985, and earned $30,000 first-prize money.

Finals

Singles
 Chris Evert defeated  Lori McNeil 6–3, 7–5
 It was Evert's 5th singles title of the year and the 153rd of her career.

Doubles
 Zina Garrison /  Lori McNeil defeated  Peanut Louie-Harper /  Heather Ludloff 6–3, 6–3

References

External links
 ITF tournament edition details

Virginia Slims of New Orleans
Virginia Slims of New Orleans
1987 in Louisiana
1987 in American tennis